Ueli Kestenholz (born 10 May 1975) is a Swiss snowboarder and Speedriding pioneer.

Kestenholz was Snowboard World Champion in 2000 and 2001. He won the first ever Olympic Medal in Snowboarding: Bronze at the 1998 Winter Olympics (Giant Slalom). He's a two times Gold medalist/Winner at the Winter X-Games in Boardercross/BoarderX.
After his third Olympic Games of Torino 2006, Ueli quit the Worldcup circuit to focus 100% on Freeriding. Besides Freeriding on a Snowboard, he became one of the pioneers of Speedriding/Speedflying in Switzerland. Together with Mathias Roten they created Playgravity, an award winning multisport-movie, showing their amazing speedriding-descent of Eiger, Monch and Jungfrau in one day. In May 2009 he did a speedriding first descent of the famous Matterhorn.

External links
http://www.kestenholz.com
http://www.playgravity.com

Swiss male snowboarders
Olympic snowboarders of Switzerland
Snowboarders at the 1998 Winter Olympics
Snowboarders at the 2002 Winter Olympics
Snowboarders at the 2006 Winter Olympics
1975 births
Living people
Olympic medalists in snowboarding
Medalists at the 1998 Winter Olympics
Olympic bronze medalists for Switzerland